Patrick Ryan (born 1958) is an Irish former hurler. At club level he played with Borris–Ileigh and was also a member of the Tipperary senior hurling team.

Career

Ryan played hurling as a schoolboy at Templemore CBS where he won consecutive Corn Phádraig titles and a Dr. Kinnane Cup in 1974 and 1975. He first played for Borris–Ileigh at juvenile and underage levels before eventually joining the club's senior team. Ryan won two North Tipperary SHC titles and a Tipperary SHC title in 1981. His accountancy studies and subsequent career abroad brought a premature end to his hurling, however, he rejoined the Borris–Ileigh team and trained with them in advance of their defeat of Rathnure in the 1987 All-Ireland club final.

Ryan first played for Tipperary during a two-year tenure at minor level. He was at midfield when the Tipperary minors beat Kilkenny in the 1976 All-Ireland minor final. Ryan subsequently spent three years with the under-21 team and won consecutive All-Ireland U21HC medals in 1978 and 1979. He was drafted onto the senior team in 1976. Ryan won a National League title in 1979 before leaving the panel in 1982.

Family

His father, Tim Ryan, and his uncles, Ned Ryan and Pat Stakelum, won All-Ireland medals with Tipperary between 1949 and 1951. His brothers, Bobby and Aidan, were part of the Tipperary team that won All-Ireland titles in 1989 and 1991.

Honours

Templemore CBS
Dr. Kinnane Cup: 1975
Corn Phádraig: 1974, 1975

Borris–Ileigh
All-Ireland Senior Club Hurling Championship: 1987
Tipperary Senior Hurling Championship: 1981
North Tipperary Senior Hurling Championship: 1976, 1981

Tipperary
National Hurling League: 1978-79
All-Ireland Under-21 Hurling Championship: 1978, 1979
Munster Under-21 Hurling Championship: 1978, 1979
All-Ireland Minor Hurling Championship: 1976
Munster Minor Hurling Championship: 1976

References

External link

 Pat Ryan player profile

1958 births
Living people
Borris-Ileigh hurlers
Tipperary inter-county hurlers